This is a list of the largest trading partners of Australia. According to data obtained in the 2018 calendar year, China was the largest partner followed by Japan and the European Union.

The largest trading partners
The 10 largest trading partners of Australia with their total trade (sum of imports and exports) in millions of Australian dollars and the total trade for all countries for the 2018 calendar year were as follows:

Top export markets
The 15 largest export markets of Australia in millions of Australian dollars for the 2019–20 financial year were as follows:

Top import sources
The 15 largest import sources to Australia in millions of Australian dollars for the 2018–19 financial year were as follows:

See also
List of the largest trading partners of the ASEAN
List of the largest trading partners of Canada
List of the largest trading partners of China
List of the largest trading partners of the European Union
List of the largest trading partners of Germany
List of the largest trading partners of Italy
List of the largest trading partners of the Netherlands
List of the largest trading partners of India
List of the largest trading partners of Russia
List of the largest trading partners of United Kingdom
List of the largest trading partners of the United States

References

Economy of Australia-related lists
Foreign trade of Australia
Australia